WRLR-LP is a low-power FM radio station that operates on the 98.3 frequency, based in Round Lake Beach, Illinois.

In 2008, the TechTalk Show was selected as one of  Information Week's 100 Top Tech Finds. In 2010, Paste Magazine named WRLR-LP one of the 40 best little radio stations in the United States. In 2011, the Houston Press also named Subterranean, WRLR-LP's Thursday night underground rock show, "the best place to hear up and coming indie-rock in the entire world."

WRLR-LP was also featured on Harry Porterfield's "Someone You Should Know" on WLS-TV, ABC's Chicago local station, broadcast March 9, 2009.

References

External links
WRLR Website
WRLR studio webcam with live audio
TechTalk podcast page with downloadable audio
 

Lake County, Illinois